Initiative 920 (I-920) was a highly controversial campaign to repeal the estate tax in the U.S. state of Washington. Washington state law directs that revenues collected from the estate tax be placed into the Education Legacy Trust account, which funds financial aid for higher education. The initiative failed, with 33.54 percent voting for and 66.46 percent against.

Supporters
The campaign to get I-920 on the ballot was primarily bankrolled by Martin Selig, a Seattle skyscraper developer, and Dennis Falk, a wealthy former Seattle police officer. Falk's involvement has been particularly controversial. Falk leads the John Birch Society. In 1978, Falk co-chaired Save Our Moral Ethics, an unsuccessful campaign to repeal a law barring housing and employment discrimination against gays and lesbians.

Supporters of I-920 claim the estate tax is an unfair burden on small business. They claim that if small businesses leave Washington, support for local schools will be eroded. They also contend that the 2005 legislature's decision to renew the estate tax contradicted I-402, which was passed in 1981.

Groups supporting I-920 include:

 Associated Builders and Contractors of Western Washington
 Association of Washington Business (AWB)
 Centralia-Chehalis Chamber of Commerce
 D.A. Burns & Sons
 Frank Gurney, Inc.
 GM Nameplate
 Greater Seattle Chamber of Commerce

Opponents

Criticism of I-920 has focused on two main points. First, critics argue that the estate tax is the most efficient way to raise revenue for education and that repealing the tax will compromise educational infrastructure, especially for the poor. Second, critics point out that the tax is graduated and therefore only impacts those most able to pay. They argue that the proponents of I-920 have used the rhetoric of small business interests to create tax breaks for the extremely wealthy. Family farms, for example, are completely exempt from the estate tax. Last year, the Washington Estate Tax affected only 250 of the wealthiest estates.

Groups opposing I-920 include:

 American Federation of Teachers of Washington
 Children's Alliance
 First Place
 International Union of Operating Engineers — Local 609
 League of Education Voters
 League of Women Voters
 Lutheran Public Policy Office of Washington State
 Martin Luther King, Jr. County Labor Council, AFL-CIO
 Pierce County Human Services Coalition
 Public School Employees of Washington
 Retired Public Employees Council of Washington
 SEIU #925
 Statewide Poverty Action Network
 Tax Right
 Washington Association of Churches
 Washington Community Action Network
 Washington Education Association
 Washington State Labor Council
 Washington State NOW
 Washington State Parent Teacher Association
 Washington Tax Fairness Coalition

Results

External links
 Full text of I-920
 OFM report on potential financial impact of I-920
 Seattle Weekly on Selig and Falk
 Pro-I-920 page
 Anti-I-920 page
 NPI on I-920
 The Childrens Alliance onf I-920
 Information on various Initiatives from Washington Voter
 The Stranger on I-920 signature gathering

References

Tax reform in the United States
Taxation in Washington (state)
2006 Washington (state) ballot measures
Initiatives in the United States
Tax reform referendums